Niphopyralis albida is a moth in the family Crambidae. It was described by George Hampson in 1893. It is found in Sri Lanka.

Description
The wingspan is about 16 mm in the male and about 20–22 mm in the female. The wings are pure white. Forewings with a few dark scales on discocellulars, and traces of a pale fulvous oblique streak across apical area. A black marginal speck on vein 2 of each wing.

References

Moths described in 1893
Crambidae